Instant Pleasures is the fifth studio album by the British rock band Shed Seven, released via BMG Rights Management in November 2017. The album charted at No.8 in the UK album chart, on sales of 13,277. This is being the first Shed Seven's album for 16 years since 2001's Truth Be Told and marked the return of lead guitarist Paul Banks since 1998's Let It Ride.

Track listing

Personnel

Shed Seven
Rick Witter – lead vocals
Paul Banks – guitar, piano
Joe Johnson - guitar, keyboards
Tom Gladwin – bass
Alan Leach – drums, percussion

Additional musicians
Michael Rendall - additional keyboards, programming
Matthew Hardy - trumpet
Timothy Hurst - trombone
Andrew Cox - saxophone
Zara Benyounes - violin
Jenny Sacha - violin
Emma Owens - viola
Rosie Danvers - cello, string arrangements
Mary Pearce - backing vocals
Beverly Skeete - backing vocals
Lara Smiles - additional vocals on "Waiting for the Catch"

Charts

References

Shed Seven albums
2017 albums
Albums produced by Youth (musician)